The Gloucester 15 is an American sailing dinghy that was designed by Rod Macalpine-Downie and Dick Gibbs and first built in 1987.

The Gloucester 15 is a development of the Chrysler Marine 1972 Mutineer 15 design, with a heavier displacement.

Production
The design was built by Gloucester Yachts in the United States, with 6,000 boats completed starting in 1987, but it is now out of production.

Design
The Gloucester 15 is a recreational sailboat, built predominantly of fiberglass, with wood trim. It has a fractional sloop rig, a plumb stem, a vertical transom, a transom-hung rudder controlled by a tiller and a retractable centerboard. It displaces .

See also
List of sailing boat types

Related development
Mutineer 15

References

External links
Photo of a Gloucester 15

Dinghies
1980s sailboat type designs
Sailboat type designs by Rod Macalpine-Downie
Sailboat type designs by Dick Gibbs
Sailboat types built by Gloucester Yachts